Mads Christensen or Mads Barner-Christensen (who goes by the moniker: blærerøven, in English: "bragging ass" = "show-off")(b. 1965) is a Danish comedian, author and public speaker, known for conservative and masculine themes. He is a former army officer from the Royal Life Guards, and has been a lifestyle and fashion editor of the magazine Euroman.

Bibliography
He has published several books including:
 Den Store Blærerøv (1998)
 Blærerøvens guide til moderne etiquette (1999)
 SEX - Hvor svært Kan Det Være (2000)
 Den store blærerøv - En guide til manden (2006)
 Blærerøv og Bjerrehuus - with Suzanne Bjerrehuus (2006)
 Blærerøven vender tilbage (2007)
 Manual til mænd med sure koner (2009)

Controversy
In April 2012, Dell hired Christensen to entertain the crowd after a presentation by Michael Dell in Copenhagen, Denmark. Dell later apologized for Christensen's remarks after a blog  about the comments went viral.

External links 
 (da)

References

Danish male comedians
1965 births
20th-century Danish non-fiction writers
21st-century Danish non-fiction writers
Living people